BlazBlue: Central Fiction, released in Japan as BlazBlue: Centralfiction, is a 2-D fighting video game developed by Arc System Works. It is the fourth game in the BlazBlue series, and is set after the events of BlazBlue: Chrono Phantasma. It is also the final game with Ragna as the main protagonist. and serves as the conclusion of the C-Series that began in Calamity Trigger.

The international release of Central Fiction did not receive an English dub, making it the only BlazBlue title not dubbed.

Plot

Central Fiction's story mode is over 40 hours long, with extra arcade mode stories separated into three acts.

Characters

All 28 fighters from BlazBlue: Chrono Phantasma Extend return in Central Fiction. This brings the total roster to 36 playable fighters.

Characters introduced in the arcade release 

Hibiki Kohaku: Kagura's secretary and personal assassin. Born into a line of assassins that serve the Mutsuki household.

Naoto Kurogane: The main protagonist of Bloodedge Experience. In Central Fiction, he is an outsider who arrived from a parallel world to search for a girl called Raquel Alucard.

Nine the Phantom: Originally one of the Six Heroes. Possessing an exceptional intellect and extraordinary magical power, she is the creator of the "Nox Nyctores" and "Ars Magus." As of 2200AD, she been seen doing the Imperator's bidding as the mysterious figure, Phantom.

Hades Izanami: The former Imperator, highest ranking political official and commander of the Novus Orbis Librarium. In reality, she is the Drive of The Origin. Her goal, to bring upon the day of reckoning, and return the world to nothing.

Characters introduced in the console release 

Es: One of the main characters of the XBlaze spinoff series. Also known as Embryo Storage. In Central Fiction, she is the gatekeeper of the Gate to the Azure, and the proxy that conveys the will of the Azure.

Mai Natsume: The main protagonist of the Remix Heart and its sequel Variable Heart manga. Heir to the Duodecim's Hazuki family, and a classmate of Noel and her friends during their days at the Military Academy..

Susano'o: One of the Six Heroes who defeated the Black Beast once upon a time, as well as Yuuki Terumi's true form. Due to the effect of the Susano'o Unit, his impulse for destruction is unchecked, and he brings atrocities tryannically.

Jubei: One of the Six Heroes, he is the father of Kokonoe, and the husband of Nine. A beastkin warrior who fights with a katana and his razor-sharp claws. He believes in duty and humanity, and has a strong sense of justice.  He was released on August 31, 2017, for North America and Japan, and September 4, 2017, for EU.

Gameplay
Following the gameplay from BlazBlue Chrono Phantasma Extend, there are additional changes and new mechanics. The Overdrive activation's duration is now shown under the Burst Gauge in the form of a countdown timer (which counts seconds and split-seconds); The character portrait near the health bar shakes when taking damage; and each character's emblem appears on their side when the phrase "The Wheel of Fate is Turning" shows at the start of the first Rebel. The new gameplay mechanics are: Exceed Accel, a special type of Distortion Drive, which is executed a same input as Overdrive activation by holding it during Overdrive activation, or pressing it, begins with the character performing a specific attack in their move-set, and once it connects the rest of the background shatters away into the Overdrive background effect when the attack is performed. It dishes large damage, but immediately ends Overdrive; and Active Flow, which acts as the opposite of Negative Penalty status. A character that fights offensively goes into an Active Flow, which boosts damage and recovery of the Burst Gauge. Active Flow also increases the damage of Exceed Accel (for some it may add extra effects and animations). When a character enters Active Flow, his/her emblem on the health bar becomes purple pink. The purple pink color itself is also shown surrounding the Overdrive Gauge, when a character is close to entering Active Flow. A character can only enter Active Flow once per round.

Release
The game was released for the arcades on November 19, 2015, with a location test having been done in mid-July of that year. A console version was released in Japan on October 6, 2016, in North America on November 1, 2016, and Europe on November 4, 2016, for the PlayStation 3 and the PlayStation 4, both physically and digitally. Aksys Games has confirmed a limited edition for North American markets which includes a soundtrack disc, a nendoroid figure and a hardcover art book.

A Steam port was released on April 26, 2017.

A Nintendo Switch release called BlazBlue: Centralfiction - Special Edition was released digitally on February 7, 2019, on Nintendo's eShop. It has also been released physically in Europe and in Japan, but not in North America besides a limited release by Limited Run Games in 2022. This version has every character including the PlayStation console added characters and the DLC character, Jubei.

At CEO 2021, it was revealed that the Steam version of the game will be patched with rollback netcode in 2022. The rollback netcode for the Steam version officially released on the 1st of February, 2022.

Reception

In Japan, BlazBlue: Central Fiction sold 26,506 copies on PS4 and 9,674 copies on PS3. Aggregate reviewer Metacritic gave BlazBlue: Central Fiction an 84 out of 100 citing generally positive reviews from websites. Famitsu gave the game a 34/40 for both the PlayStation 4 and PlayStation 3 versions. Chris Carter of Destructoid gave the title an 8.5/10 while complimenting the impressive amount of effort with few problems for a niche game. Filippo Facchetti of Eurogamer gave Central Fiction a 9/10 recommending players who love fighting games and/or anime to buy the title.

References

External links 

2015 video games
2D fighting games
Arc System Works games
Arcade video games
BlazBlue
Fighting games used at the Evolution Championship Series tournament
Fighting games
Multiplayer and single-player video games
NESiCAxLive games
Nintendo Switch games
PlayStation 3 games
PlayStation 4 games
PlayStation 4 Pro enhanced games
PQube games
Production I.G
Video games about amnesia
Video games developed in Japan
Windows games